The women's heptathlon at the 2018 European Athletics Championships took place at the Olympic Stadium on 9 and 10 August.

Records

Schedule
All times are Brasilia Time (UTC-3)

Results

100 metres hurdles

High jump

Shot put

200 metres

Long jump

Javelin throw

800 metres 

Note: Mareike Arndt and Louisa Grauvogel were involved in a car crash between the second day sessions and were both taken to hospital, which forced them to withdraw from the last event.

Final standings

References

External links
 official championship site

heptathlon W
Combined events at the European Athletics Championships
Euro